Erana can refer to:

 Erana (Cilicia), a town of ancient Cilicia, now in Turkey
 Erana (Messenia), a town of ancient Messenia, Greece
 List of Quest for Glory characters#Erana, a fictional character in the Quest for Glory computer game series